Hefin is a Welsh surname and male given name. Notable people with this name include:

Surname
 David Thomas (Dewi Hefin) (1828–1909), Welsh poet and teacher
 John Hefin (1941–2012), Welsh television director

Given name
 Hefin David (born 1977), Welsh politician
 Hefin O'Hare (born 1979), Welsh rugby union and rugby league player